Colonial Air Transport was an early airline that flew between New York City and Boston, Massachusetts.

History
It was established as Bee Line on 16 March 1923 and operated out Naugatuck, Connecticut; in 1926 was reorganised in New York City by Juan Trippe.

Colonial acquired rights to fly the early U.S. airmail commercial route CAM-1, with the first flight held on July 26, 1926.

In 1927, the headquarters were moved to Boston.

On April 15 1929, they started passenger service between New York City  and Boston, Massachusetts.

In May 1929, it was acquired by AVCO.

Fleet 
The Colonial Air Transport fleet consisted of the following aircraft as of 1926:

See also 
 List of defunct airlines of the United States

References

Defunct airlines of the United States
Airlines established in 1926
Airlines disestablished in 1930
Companies based in Boston
Airlines based in Massachusetts